PLGA, PLG, or poly(lactic-co-glycolic acid) is a copolymer which is used in a host of Food and Drug Administration (FDA) approved therapeutic devices, owing to its biodegradability and biocompatibility. PLGA is synthesized by means of ring-opening co-polymerization of two different monomers, the cyclic dimers (1,4-dioxane-2,5-diones) of glycolic acid and lactic acid. Polymers can be synthesized as either random or block copolymers thereby imparting additional polymer properties. Common catalysts used in the preparation of this polymer include tin(II) 2-ethylhexanoate, tin(II) alkoxides, or aluminum isopropoxide. During polymerization, successive monomeric units (of glycolic or lactic acid) are linked together in PLGA by ester linkages, thus yielding a linear, aliphatic polyester as a product.

Copolymer
Depending on the ratio of lactide to glycolide used for the polymerization, different forms of PLGA can be obtained: these are usually identified in regard to the molar ratio of the monomers used (e.g. PLGA 75:25 identifies a copolymer whose composition is 75% lactic acid and 25% glycolic acid). The crystallinity of PLGAs will vary from fully amorphous to fully crystalline depending on block structure and molar ratio.  PLGAs typically show a glass transition temperature in the range of 40-60 °C. PLGA can be dissolved by a wide range of solvents, depending on composition.  Higher lactide polymers can be dissolved using chlorinated solvents whereas higher glycolide materials will require the use of fluorinated solvents such as HFIP.

PLGA degrades by hydrolysis of its ester linkages in the presence of water. It has been shown that the time required for degradation of PLGA is related to the monomers' ratio used in production: the higher the content of glycolide units, the lower the time required for degradation as compared to predominantly lactide materials. An exception to this rule is the copolymer with 50:50 monomers' ratio which exhibits the faster degradation (about two months). In addition, polymers that are end-capped with esters (as opposed to the free carboxylic acid) demonstrate longer degradation half-lives. This flexibility in degradation has made it convenient for fabrication of many medical devices, such as, grafts, sutures, implants, prosthetic devices, surgical sealant films, micro and nanoparticles.

PLGA undergoes hydrolysis in the body to produce the original monomers: lactic acid and glycolic acid. These two monomers under normal physiological conditions, are by-products of various metabolic pathways in the body. Lactic acid is metabolized in the tricarboxylic acid cycle and eliminated via carbon dioxide and water. Glycolic acid is metabolized in the same way, and also excreted through the kidney. The body also can metabolize the two monomers, which in the case of glycolic acid produces small amounts of the toxic oxalic acid, though the amounts produced from typical applications are minuscule and there is minimal systemic toxicity associated with using PLGA for biomaterial applications. However, it has been reported that the acidic degradation of PLGA reduces the local pH low enough to create an autocatalytic environment. It has been shown that the pH inside a microsphere can become as acidic as pH 1.5.

Examples
Specific examples of PLGA's use include:
 A commercially available Dental Barrier Membrane (Powerbone Barrier Membrane for bone regeneration in conjunction with or prior to dental implant placement. 
 A commercially available drug delivery device using PLGA is Lupron Depot for the treatment of advanced prostate cancer.
 prophylactic delivery of the antibiotic vancomycin into the central nervous system when applied to the surface of the brain after brain surgery

See also 
 Polycaprolactone
 Polyglycolide
 Polymer-drug conjugates
 Polylactic acid
 Poly-3-hydroxybutyrate

References

External links

Copolymers
Synthetic fibers
Biodegradable plastics
Polyesters